The Kumasi Military Hospital is a military hospital in Afari in the Atwima Nwabiagya District of the Ashanti Region of Ghana.

References 

Military installations of Ghana
Ashanti Region
Hospitals in Ghana
Military hospitals